Ammonium chlorate is an inorganic compound with the formula NH4ClO3.

It is obtained by neutralizing chloric acid with either ammonia or ammonium carbonate, or by precipitating barium, strontium or calcium chlorates with ammonium carbonate or ammonium sulfate, producing the respective carbonate or sulfate precipitate and an ammonium chlorate solution.   Ammonium chlorate crystallizes in small needles, readily soluble in water.

The bitartrate method is a candidate for production and can be used if exotic chlorates are currently inaccessible or need to be synthesized.  Warm solutions of potassium chlorate and ammonium bitartrate are needed. The latter can be synthesized by adding aqueous ammonia to an excess of tartaric acid. Then, a double displacement reaction will result in precipitation of ammonium chlorate.

On heating, ammonium chlorate decomposes at about 102 °C, with liberation of nitrogen, chlorine and oxygen.  It is soluble in dilute aqueous alcohol, but insoluble in strong alcohol. This compound is a powerful oxidizer and should never be stored with flammable materials, as it can easily form sensitive explosive compositions.

Ammonium chlorate is a very unstable oxidizer and will decompose independently, sometimes violently, at room temperature. This results from the mixture of the reducing ammonium cation and the oxidizing chlorate anion. Even solutions are known to be unstable.  Because of the dangerous nature of this salt it should only be kept in solution when needed, and never be allowed to crystallize.

Preparation
Ammonium chlorate can be made by mixing stoichiometric solutions of ammonium nitrate and sodium chlorate or ammonium sulfate and barium chlorate.

References

Ammonium compounds
Chlorates
Explosive chemicals
Oxidizing agents